Upper Karabakh Economic Region was one of the 10 economic regions of Azerbaijan. It bordered Iran to the south, as well as the economic regions of Kalbajar-Lachin, Ganja-Gazakh and Aran. The region consisted of the districts of Tartar, Agdam, Khojaly, Khankendi, Shusha, Khojavend, Jabrayil and Fuzuli.

The region was abolished on 7 July 2021 and its territory was split between the Karabakh Economic Region and East Zangezur Economic Region.

Transport network 

Alat-Julfa, Yevlakh-Agdam-Khankendi railways pass through the territory of the economic-geographical region. Barda-Agdam-Khankendi-Shusha-Lachin, Agdam-Khojavend-Fuzuli-Horadiz, Alat-Julfa, Tartar-Agdara-Kalbajar highways connect the territory of the economic-geographical region with other regions of the republic (Table 5.15).

Public roads in the economic-geographical region, km (2012)

References

Economic regions of Azerbaijan